Stadio dei Marsi is a stadium in the Via Napoli ("Naples Street") neighbourhood of Avezzano, Italy. It was built between the years '30 and '50. In the past it was used for athletics events and there was a tennis court, it is currently used mostly for football matches and is the home ground of Avezzano Calcio.  The stadium holds 3,692. It named after the ancient population of Marsi.

References

Bibliography

Marsi
Avezzano Calcio